Warragul is the eighth studio album by Australian country music artist John Williamson. The album was released in September 1989 and peaked at number 1 on the ARIA Charts; becoming Williamson's first number 1 album.

At the ARIA Music Awards of 1990, the album won ARIA Award for Best Country Album. It was also nominated for Best Adult Contemporary Album.

Track listing

Charts

Weekly charts

Year-end charts

Certifications

Release history

See also
 List of number-one albums in Australia during the 1980s

References

1989 albums
John Williamson (singer) albums
Festival Records albums
ARIA Award-winning albums